The following outline is provided as an overview of and topical guide to Pakistan:

Pakistan – sovereign country located in South Asia. It has a  coastline along the Arabian Sea and Gulf of Oman in the south and is bordered by Afghanistan in the west, Iran in the southwest, India in the east and China in the far northeast.

General reference 
 Pronunciation: /ˌpɑːkɪˈstɑːn/
 Common English country name:  Pakistan
 Official English country name:  The Islamic Republic of Pakistan
 Common endonym(s):  
 Official endonym(s): Islami Jumhuriyah-e-Pakistan
 Adjectival(s): Pakistani
 Demonym(s): Pakistani
 Etymology: Name of Pakistan
 International rankings of Pakistan
 ISO country codes:  PK, PAK, 586
 ISO region codes:  See ISO 3166-2:PK
 Internet country code top-level domain:  .pk

Geography of Pakistan 

 Pakistan is:
Country | Middle Power
Sovereign state | Member of Organization of Islam
 Location:
 Eastern Hemisphere 
 Northern Hemisphere
 Eurasia
 Asia
 South Asia
 Iranian Plateau
 Indian subcontinent
 Time in Pakistan
Time zone:Pakistan Standard Time (UTC+05)
 Extreme points of Pakistan
 High: K2  – second highest peak on Earth
 Low:  Arabian Sea 
Land boundaries: 7,307 km km
 3,323 km
 2,430 km
 959  km
 595 km
 Coastline: 1,146 km | (Arabian Sea | Indian Ocean)
 Population of Pakistan: 219,347,294 (Census 2017) – 5th most populous country
 Area of Pakistan:  ((Excluding Claimed Territories) – 33rd largest country
 Atlas of Pakistan
 Subcontinent (Indian subcontinent)
 List of cities in Pakistan
 List of Union Councils in Pakistan

Environment of Pakistan 

 Climate of Pakistan
 Environmental issues in Pakistan
 Ecoregions in Pakistan
 Renewable energy in Pakistan
 Geology of Pakistan
 Earthquakes in Pakistan
 Protected areas of Pakistan
 Biosphere reserves of Pakistan
 National parks of Pakistan
 Wildlife of Pakistan
 Flora of Pakistan
 Fauna of Pakistan
 Birds of Pakistan
 Mammals of Pakistan
 Fish of Pakistan
 Amphibians of Pakistan
 Reptiles of Pakistan

Geographic features of Pakistan 

 Glaciers of Pakistan
 Islands of Pakistan
 Lakes of Pakistan
 Mountains of Pakistan
 Volcanoes in Pakistan
 Rivers of Pakistan
 Waterfalls of Pakistan
 Valleys of Pakistan
 List of World Heritage Sites in Pakistan

Administrative divisions of Pakistan

Provinces and territories Of Pakistan 

 Provinces of Pakistan
 By name:
 Punjab, Pakistan
 Sindh
 Khyber Pakhtunkhwa
 Balochistan, Pakistan
 Territories of Pakistan
 Azad Kashmir
 Gilgit-Baltistan
 Islamabad

Divisions of Pakistan 

 Divisions of Punjab, Pakistan
 Bahawalpur | Dera Ghazi Khan | Faisalabad | Gujranwala | Lahore | Multan | Rawalpindi | Sahiwal | Sargodha | Sheikhupura
 Divisions of Sindh
 Bhanbore | Hyderabad | Karachi | Sukkur | Larkana | Mirpur Khas | Shaheed Benazirabad 
 Divisions of Khyber Pakhtunkhwa
 Bannu | Dera Ismail Khan | Hazara | Kohat | Malakand | Mardan | Peshawar 
 Divisions of Balochistan, Pakistan
 Kalat | Makran | Naseerabad | Quetta | Rakhshan | Sibi | Zhob 
 Divisions of Azad Kashmir
 Mirpur | Muzaffarabad | Poonch 
 Divisions of Gilgit-Baltistan
 Baltistan | Gilgit | Diamer

Districts of Pakistan 
Districts of Pakistan

Municipalities of Pakistan 

 Capital of Pakistan: Islamabad
 Cantonment (Pakistan)
 Cities of Pakistan

Demography of Pakistan 

Ethnic groups in Pakistan
Religion in Pakistan

Government and politics of Pakistan 
 

 Form of government:Sovereign socialistSovereign Socialist Secular Federal Parliamentary Multi-party Representative Democratic Republic.
 Capital of Pakistan: Islamabad
 Elections in Pakistan
1954 (indirect elections) = ML 
 1962 (non-party based indirect elections) 
 3rd elections : 1970 = AL 
 4th elections : 1977 = PPP 
 5th elections : 1985 = PML 
 6th elections : 1988 = PPP 
 7th elections : 1990 = IJI 
 8th elections : 1993 = PPP 
 9th elections : 1997 = PMLN 
 10th elections : 2002 = PMLQ 
 11th elections : 2008 = PPP 
 12th elections : 2013 = PMLN 
 13th elections : 2018 = PTI

Political parties in Pakistan

Branches of the government of Pakistan

Executive of the government of Pakistan 
 Head of state: President of Pakistan
 Head of government: Prime Minister of Pakistan
 Part of Government: Cabinet of Pakistan | Cabinet Secretary of Pakistan

Legislature of the government of Pakistan 
 Parliament of Pakistan
 Senate of Pakistan (Aiwān-e-Bālā Pākistān) - upper house of the parliament (Chairman of the Senate of Pakistan)
 National Assembly (Aiwān-e-Zairīñ Pākistān) - lower house of the parliament (Speaker of the National Assembly of Pakistan)

Judiciary of the government of Pakistan 

 Supreme Court of Pakistan (Chief Justice of Pakistan)
 High Courts of Pakistan
 District Courts of Pakistan

Foreign relations of Pakistan 

 Diplomatic missions in Pakistan
 Diplomatic missions of Pakistan
 India-Pakistan relations
 Pakistan and the Commonwealth of Nations

International organization membership 
The Islamic Republic of Pakistan is a member of:

African Union/United Nations Hybrid operation in Darfur (UNAMID)
Asian Development Bank (ADB)
Association of Southeast Asian Nations Regional Forum (ARF)
Colombo Plan (CP)
Commonwealth of Nations
Economic Cooperation Organization (ECO)
Food and Agriculture Organization (FAO)
Group of 24 (G24)
Group of 77 (G77)
International Atomic Energy Agency (IAEA)
International Bank for Reconstruction and Development (IBRD)
International Chamber of Commerce (ICC)
International Civil Aviation Organization (ICAO)
International Criminal Court (ICCt)
International Criminal Police Organization (Interpol)
International Development Association (IDA)
International Federation of Red Cross and Red Crescent Societies (IFRCS)
International Finance Corporation (IFC)
International Fund for Agricultural Development (IFAD)
International Hydrographic Organization (IHO)
International Labour Organization (ILO)
International Maritime Organization (IMO)
International Mobile Satellite Organization (IMSO)
International Monetary Fund (IMF)
International Olympic Committee (IOC)
International Organization for Migration (IOM)
International Organization for Standardization (ISO)
International Telecommunication Union (ITU)
International Telecommunications Satellite Organization (ITSO)
International Trade Union Confederation (ITUC)
Inter-Parliamentary Union (IPU)
Islamic Development Bank (IDB)

Multilateral Investment Guarantee Agency (MIGA)
Nonaligned Movement (NAM)
Organisation of Islamic Cooperation (OIC)
Organisation for the Prohibition of Chemical Weapons (OPCW)
Organization of American States (OAS) (observer)
Partnership for Peace (PFP)
Shanghai Cooperation Organisation (SCO)
South Asia Co-operative Environment Programme (SACEP)
South Asian Association for Regional Cooperation (SAARC)
United Nations (UN)
United Nations Conference on Trade and Development (UNCTAD)
United Nations Educational, Scientific, and Cultural Organization (UNESCO)
United Nations High Commissioner for Refugees (UNHCR)
United Nations Industrial Development Organization (UNIDO)
United Nations Integrated Mission in Timor-Leste (UNMIT)
United Nations Mission for the Referendum in Western Sahara (MINURSO)
United Nations Mission in Liberia (UNMIL)
United Nations Mission in the Central African Republic and Chad (MINURCAT)
United Nations Mission in the Sudan (UNMIS)
United Nations Observer Mission in Georgia (UNOMIG)
United Nations Operation in Cote d'Ivoire (UNOCI)
United Nations Organization Mission in the Democratic Republic of the Congo (MONUC)
Universal Postal Union (UPU)
World Confederation of Labour (WCL)
World Customs Organization (WCO)
World Federation of Trade Unions (WFTU)
World Health Organization (WHO)
World Intellectual Property Organization (WIPO)
World Meteorological Organization (WMO)
World Tourism Organization (UNWTO)
World Trade Organization (WTO)

Law and order in Pakistan 

 Capital punishment in Pakistan
 Constitution of Pakistan
 Crime in Pakistan
 Human rights in Pakistan
 LGBT rights in Pakistan
 Freedom of religion in Pakistan
 Law enforcement in Pakistan

Pakistani Armed Forces 

Command
Commander-in-chief:President of Pakistan
Ministry of Defence of Pakistan
National Security Council (Pakistan)
Minister of Defence (Pakistan)
Defence Secretary of Pakistan
Joint Chiefs of Staff Committee
Chief of Army Staff (Pakistan)
Chief of Naval Staff (Pakistan)
Chief of Air Staff (Pakistan)
Forces

Pakistan Army
Special Service Group
National Guard (Pakistan)
Janbaz Force
Mujahid Force
National Cadet Corps (Pakistan)
Pakistan Navy
Pakistan Maritime Security Agency
Pakistan Marines
Special Service Group (Navy)
Pakistan Air Force
Special Services Wing
 Inter-Services
Inter-Services Intelligence
Inter-Services Public Relations
Inter-Services Selection Board
Special Support Group
Khyber Border Coordination Center
Strategic Plans Division Force
Pakistan Armed Forces Band
Civil Armed Forces
Frontier Corps Khyber Pakhtunkhwa (North)
Frontier Corps Khyber Pakhtunkhwa (South)
Frontier Corps Balochistan (North)
Frontier Corps Balochistan (South)
Frontier Constabulary
Gilgit-Baltistan Scouts
Pakistan Rangers
Pakistan Coast Guards
 Police
Anti-Narcotics Force
Airports Security Force
 Pakistan Levies

Local government in Pakistan 

Local government in Pakistan

History of Pakistan 

 Ancient Civilizations
 Indus Valley civilization (3300–1700 BCE)
 Late Harappan culture (1700–1300 BCE)
 Islamic empires (1206–1858)
 Delhi Sultanate (1206–1596)
 Mughal Empire (1526–1858)
 Colonial India (1858–1947)
 British Raj
 Princely states
 Pakistan Movement
 Two-nation theory (Pakistan)
 Partition of India (1947)
 Timeline of Pakistani history (1947–present) 
 History of the Islamic Republic of Pakistan
 Economic history of Pakistan
 Military history of Pakistan

Culture of Pakistan 

 Architecture of Pakistan
 Cuisine of Pakistan
 Ethnic minorities in Pakistan
 Languages of Pakistan
 Media in Pakistan
 National symbols of Pakistan
 Coat of arms of Pakistan
 Flag of Pakistan
 National anthem of Pakistan
 People of Pakistan
 Prostitution in Pakistan
 Public holidays in Pakistan
 Religion in Pakistan
 Buddhism in Pakistan
 Christianity in Pakistan
 Hinduism in Pakistan
 Islam in Pakistan
 Ahmadiyya in Pakistan
 Judaism in Pakistan
 Sikhism in Pakistan
 List of World Heritage Sites in Pakistan
 Tribes in Balochistan
 :Category:Punjabi tribes
 Tribes in North-West Frontier Province
 Afridi
 Orakzai
 Bangash
 Khattak
 Mahsud
 Marwat
 Mohmand
 Wazir
 Yusufzai
 Tribes in Punjab
 Tribes in Balochistan 
Baloch people
Hazara people
 Tribes in Sindh
 Bhil
 Kolhi
 Sami people
 Khati
 Bhangi
 Rabari
 Charan
 Sati
 Lohar
 Tribes in Gilgit-Baltistan
 Balti people
 Shina people
 Burusho people
Dard people
Domba
Yashkuns

Art in Pakistan 
 Cinema of Pakistan
 Literature of Pakistan
 Music of Pakistan
 Television in Pakistan
 Theatre in Pakistan

Sports in Pakistan 

 Pakistan men's national field hockey team
 Cricket in Pakistan
 Polo in Pakistan
 Football in Pakistan
 Squash in Pakistan
 Billiards in Pakistan
 Tour de Pakistan
 Pakistan national kabaddi team
 Pakistan at the Olympics
 National Participation: National Games of Pakistan
 International Participation: Pakistan at the Commonwealth Games | Pakistan at the Asian Games | South Asian Games | Cricket World Cup | Men's FIH Hockey World Cup

Economy and infrastructure of Pakistan 

 Economic rank, by nominal GDP (2019): 40th (forty)
 Agriculture in Pakistan
 Banking in Pakistan
 National Bank of Pakistan
 Communications in Pakistan
 Internet in Pakistan
 Companies of Pakistan
Currency of Pakistan: Rupee
ISO 4217: PKR
 Economic history of Pakistan
 Energy in Pakistan
 Energy policy of Pakistan
 Oil Industry in Pakistan
 Health care in Pakistan
 Family planning in Pakistan
 Mining in Pakistan
 Pakistan Stock Exchange
 Tourism in Pakistan
 Transport in Pakistan
 Airports in Pakistan
 Rail transport in Pakistan
 Roads in Pakistan
 Water supply and sanitation in Pakistan

Education in Pakistan

See also 

Pakistan
Ba'ab-ul-Islam
List of international rankings
List of Pakistan-related topics
Member state of the Commonwealth of Nations
Member state of the United Nations
Outline of Asia
Outline of geography

References

External links 

 Government of Pakistan
 The President of Pakistan
 The Ministry of Information and Broadcasting
 
 

Outline
 
Pakistan